Ivan Krastev (born 29 April 1946) is a Bulgarian former wrestler who competed in the 1972 Summer Olympics.

References

External links
 

1946 births
Living people
Olympic wrestlers of Bulgaria
Wrestlers at the 1972 Summer Olympics
Bulgarian male sport wrestlers
Olympic bronze medalists for Bulgaria
Olympic medalists in wrestling
Medalists at the 1972 Summer Olympics
20th-century Bulgarian people
21st-century Bulgarian people